Claudia Bishop is the pen name of two different authors:

Jane Feather, British-American romantic fiction writer
Mary Stanton, American mystery fiction writer (Hemlock Falls Mystery series)